Go, Dog. Go! is a 1961 children's book written and illustrated by P. D. Eastman. It describes the actions and interactions of a group of highly mobile dogs, who operate cars and other conveyances in pursuit of work, play, and a final mysterious goal: a dog party.

The book introduces concepts such as color and relative position with simple language and humor. ("The blue dog is in. The red dog is out.")
The book helps children learn basic concepts and actions like playing, working, going up, going down. The book also teaches children colors and conveys emotion. 

The dogs featured in the book use their cars to help them get their work done and get to places. Throughout the book, details in Eastman's illustrations seem to invite the reader to notice the deeper significance of small things.

In their first appearance, a pink dog asks a yellow dog if he likes her hat with its little flower. He does not, so they part. Several pages later, we meet them again as they are riding scooters. She has a hat with a feather, and again he does not like her hat. But as they part, he has made off with the feather. When we next see them together, they are skiing. The yellow dog does not like the long ski cap the pink dog is wearing. As they leave, she bids him farewell. In their final meeting, her hat — now even more elaborate — finally meets the approval of the yellow dog. In this way, a relationship development is shown between the characters despite the simplicity of the text. It shows interaction when the dogs meet. Throughout the book, the conclusion is elusive, but at the end all the dogs have a wild party.

Adaptations
 In 2003, a musical version of the book was developed by Steven Dietz and Allison Gregory for the Seattle Children's Theatre. The play has been widely staged throughout the U.S., often as an introduction to theater for young children. 
 A CGI television series based on the book and produced by DreamWorks Animation and WildBrain Studios premiered on Netflix on January 26, 2021.

Notes

1961 children's books
American picture books
Random House books
Books by P. D. Eastman
Books about dogs
Children's books adapted into television shows
Books adapted into plays